Mesophleps trinotella is a moth of the family Gelechiidae. It is found in Portugal, Spain (including the Balearic Islands), France, Italy, the Czech Republic, Hungary, Turkey, Morocco, Algeria and Libya, as well as on Corsica, Sardinia, Sicily and Cyprus.

The wingspan is 8–14.5 mm. The forewings are ochre, the costal and dorsal margin and apex dark brown, mixed with white-tipped scales. Adults are on wing from late May to September in one or two generations per year.

The larvae feed on Erysimum cheiri, Erysimum marschallianum, Erysimum hieraciifolium, Moricandia arvensis and possibly other Cruciferae species. They live in the fruit and feed on the seeds. Pupation takes place in the seed capsule. The larvae can be found in August.

References

Moths described in 1856
Mesophleps
Moths of Europe
Moths of Asia